The One-Pro 45 (stylized as onepro.45 or one PRO.45) is a semi-automatic pistol chambered in .45 ACP (with some variants in .400 Cor-Bon) and manufactured in Wettingen, (previously Solothurn) Switzerland. It was at one time imported into the United States by Magnum Research and into Italy by ALGIMEC.

References

External links 
 Company webpage
 Security Arms website - Picture
 ASAI OnePro Review - Video

.45 ACP semi-automatic pistols
Semi-automatic pistols of Switzerland